The Group IV tournament was held April 1–6, in Calliaqua, Saint Vincent, on outdoor hard courts.

Format
The six teams played in a single Round-robin tournament . The top two teams  were promoted to the Americas Zone Group III in 2003.

Results of Individual Ties

Bolivia and Saint Lucia promoted to Group III for 2003.

References

2002 Davis Cup Americas Zone
Davis Cup Americas Zone